In fluid dynamics, the Galilei number (Ga), sometimes also referred to as Galileo number (see discussion), is a dimensionless number named after Italian scientist Galileo Galilei (1564-1642).

It may be regarded as proportional to gravity forces divided by viscous forces.  The Galilei number is used in viscous flow and thermal expansion calculations, for example to describe fluid film flow over walls. These flows apply to condensers or chemical columns.

 g: gravitational acceleration, (SI units: m/s2)
 L: characteristic length, (SI units: m)
 ν: characteristic kinematic viscosity, (SI units: m2/s)

See also
Archimedes number

References
VDI-Wärmeatlas; 5., extended Edition; VDI Verlag Düsseldorf; 1988; page Bc 1 (German)
W. Wagner; Wärmeübertragung; 5., revised Edition; Vogel Fachbuch; 1998; page 119 (German)

External links
 Website referring to the Galileo number with calculator
 Table of dimensionless numbers (German)
 Table of dimensionless numbers (German)

Dimensionless numbers of fluid mechanics
Fluid dynamics